Middlemount is a mining town in Queensland, Australia.

Middlemount may also refer to:

Middlemount Airport, the airport for the above mining town
Middlemount (townland), County Laois, Ireland

See also
Middle Mountain (disambiguation)